Chelmsford and Essex Hospital was a health facility in New London Road, Chelmsford, Essex. It was managed by Mid Essex Hospital Services NHS Trust.

History
The facility has it origins in a dispensary in Duke Street which opened in 1818. It moved to a rented building in Moulsham Street in 1871 and then to a purpose-built facility in New London Road, designed by Fred Chancellor and opened by Daisy Greville, Countess of Warwick, in 1883. It joined the National Health Service as Chelmsford and Essex Hospital in 1948. After services transferred to Broomfield Hospital, the main building was downgraded to the status of a health centre and the rest of the site was subsequently redeveloped for residential use.

References

Hospital buildings completed in 1883
Hospitals established in 1818
Hospitals in Essex
Defunct hospitals in England
1818 establishments in England
Buildings and structures in Chelmsford (city)